Oxytelus incisus is a species of rove beetle with cosmopolitan distribution across the continents.

Description
This smaller species can be identified from congeners by the deep and narrow incision in tergite X. Male is about 3.5 mm and female is 3.7 mm in length. Body is brown in color. Head and pronotum are darker brown. Antennae, mandibles and legs are dark yellow. In abdomen, there are 5 visible stripes. In male, head is sub-pentagonal. Clypeus sub-rectangular. Mandibles are stout and lightly curved. Epistomal suture with curved lateral portions. Eyes are with coarse facets. Mandible is slightly curved. Pronotum transverse. Elytra punctate and rugose. Abdomen coriaceous and covered with dense fine hairs. Female is very similar to male but with more convex vertex. Spermatheca  υ-shaped.

References 

Staphylinidae
Insects of Sri Lanka
Insects of India
Insects described in 1857